Die unvollkommene Ehe is a 1959 Austrian comedy film directed by Robert A. Stemmle. It was entered into the 1st Moscow International Film Festival.

Cast
 Paula Wessely as Frau Dr. Winifred Lert
 Johanna Matz as Susi - ihre Tochter
 Johannes Heesters as Professor Paul Lert
 Dietmar Schönherr as Rolf Beckmayer - Schriftsteller
 Fritz Schulz as Ernst Fiala - Bürovorsteher
 Gudrun Schmidt as Yelli Ball - Schauspielerin
 Friedl Czepa as Hanni - Wirtschafterin
 Karl Hackenberg as Max Schnack - Textdichter
 Raoul Retzer as Karl Linnegger - Straßenbahnschaffner

References

External links
 

1959 films
1959 comedy films
Austrian comedy films
1950s German-language films
Films directed by Robert A. Stemmle